is a Japanese swimmer. She competed in the women's 400 metre freestyle event at the 2016 Summer Olympics. She qualified to represent Japan at the 2020 Summer Olympics.

References

External links
 

1995 births
Living people
Japanese female freestyle swimmers
Olympic swimmers of Japan
Swimmers at the 2016 Summer Olympics
Swimmers at the 2020 Summer Olympics
Place of birth missing (living people)
Medalists at the FINA World Swimming Championships (25 m)
Universiade medalists in swimming
Asian Games medalists in swimming
Swimmers at the 2014 Asian Games
Swimmers at the 2018 Asian Games
Asian Games gold medalists for Japan
Asian Games silver medalists for Japan
Asian Games bronze medalists for Japan
Medalists at the 2014 Asian Games
Medalists at the 2018 Asian Games
Universiade gold medalists for Japan
Medalists at the 2017 Summer Universiade
21st-century Japanese women